Lavrentyev or Lavrentiev and Lavrentyeva (feminine) is a common Russian surname.

People with this surname include:
 Arseniy Lavrentyev (born 1983), Russian-born Portuguese swimmer
 Boris Innokentievich Lavrentiev (1892–1944), Soviet histologist
 Mikhail Lavrentyev (1900–1980), a Soviet mathematician
 Oleg Lavrentiev (1926–2011), a Soviet-Ukrainian physicist, the author of idea of a thermonuclear bomb
 Sergei Lavrentyev (b. 1972), a Russian footballer and coach
 Yekaterina Lavrentyeva (b. 1981), a Russian luger

References 

Patronymic surnames
Russian-language surnames
Surnames from given names